Walter Morrison (21 May 1836 – 18 December 1921) was an English Liberal and Liberal Unionist politician who sat in the House of Commons in three periods between 1861 and 1900. He was a major funder and the treasurer of the Palestine Exploration Fund; in later years the fund was dependent on his donations.

Morrison was the son of James Morrison and his wife Mary Anne Todd, daughter of Joseph Todd of London. His father was of the firm of Morrison, Dillon, & Co., and was a former MP for Ipswich. He was educated at Eton College and at Balliol College, Oxford graduating BA in 1857, and MA in 1862. He was a J.P. for the West Riding of Yorkshire, and Lieutenant-colonel of the West Riding Rifle Volunteers.

In 1861, Morrison was elected Member of Parliament for Plymouth. He held the seat until 1874. At the 1886 general election he was elected MP for Skipton as a Liberal Unionist and held the seat until 1892. He was re-elected at Skipton in 1895 and held the seat to 1900. He served as High Sheriff of Yorkshire for 1883–84.

Morrison died, unmarried, at the age of 85.

References

External links
 

1836 births
1921 deaths
People educated at Eton College
Liberal Party (UK) MPs for English constituencies
Liberal Unionist Party MPs for English constituencies
UK MPs 1859–1865
UK MPs 1865–1868
UK MPs 1868–1874
UK MPs 1886–1892
UK MPs 1895–1900
Members of the Parliament of the United Kingdom for Plymouth
High Sheriffs of Yorkshire
Presidents of Co-operative Congress